The 2010 World TeamTennis season was the 35th season of the top professional tennis league in the United States.

Competition format
The 2010 World TeamTennis season included 10 teams, split into two conferences (Eastern and Western) playing a 14 match regular season schedule, with 7 home and 7 away matches. WTT’s playoff format consisted of the top two teams in each conference playing a semifinal on July 23, and the winners of each match playing in the final on July 24, 2010.

Standings

Results table

Playoffs

Source-

References

External links
 Official WTT website

World TeamTennis seasons
World Team season
2010 in American tennis